The 2022 Chinese Professional Baseball League season was the 33rd season of the Chinese Professional Baseball League (CPBL), based in Taiwan.

Season schedule

The regular season began on 2 April 2022 at the Taichung Intercontinental Baseball Stadium. Teams are playing a split-season, while second-half games started on 22 July at the newly-renovated Hsinchu Municipal Baseball Stadium. The CPBL All-Star Game is being played the weekend of 30–31 July.

The postseason started on 29 October, followed by the first game of the Taiwan Series on 5 November. Postseason play featured a Playoff Series, played by the half-season champion with the lower winning percentage against the team with the  next-highest winning percentage. The winner of the Playoff Series faced the half-season champion with the higher winning percentage in the Taiwan Series.

Draft

From 2022, foreign-born players can be considered domestic draft picks if: they have attended a Taiwanese high school for three years, a Taiwanese university for four years, or have lived in Taiwan for five years, while playing for a Taiwanese semi-professional league for three years.

Milestones

On Opening Day, Lin Chih-sheng, who was released by the CTBC Brothers at the end of last season, hit the 290th home run of his career, breaking the league record held by Chang Tai-shan, who is a coach for his newly adopted team, the Wei Chuan Dragons.

Controversies

On the opening weekend of the second half of the season, the high expectations for the re-opening of the Hsinchu Municipal Baseball Stadium were dashed when the league announced that the stadium was to be closed temporarily due to player safety issues.  Injuries to players in both games played showed inadequacies in the stadium, including the nature of the dirt in the infield.  The stadium was to have been a second home to the Wei Chuan Dragons for the second half of the season, but as of this time it is unclear when games will be played in the stadium again.

Standings

First half standings

Second half standings

Full season standings

Green denotes first-half or second-half champion.
Yellow denotes clinching playoff qualification as the wild card.

Playoffs

Statistical leaders

Hitting

Pitching

See also

2022 in baseball
2022 Major League Baseball season
2022 KBO League season
2022 Nippon Professional Baseball season

References

External links

Chinese Professional Baseball League season
Chinese Professional Baseball League season
Chinese Professional Baseball League seasons